Funky Monkey may refer to:

 "Funky Monkey", an episode of Class of 3000, an animated series
 Funky Monkey (film), a 2004 film starring Matthew Modine and Roma Downey
 Funky Monkey (game), a game developed and published by Konami in 1994